An antefix (from Latin , to fasten before) is a vertical block which terminates and conceals the covering tiles of a tiled roof (see imbrex and tegula, monk and nun).  It also serves to protect the join from the elements. In grand buildings, the face of each stone antefix was richly carved, often with the anthemion ornament. In less grand buildings moulded ceramic antefixes, usually terracotta, might be decorated with figures heads, either of humans, mythological creatures, or astrological iconography, especially in the Roman period. On temple roofs, maenads and satyrs were often alternated.  The frightening features of the Gorgon, with its petrifying eyes and sharp teeth was also a popular motif to ward off evil.  A Roman example from the Augustan period features the butting heads of two billy goats.  It may have had special significance in imperial Rome since the constellation Capricorn was adopted by the emperor Augustus as his own lucky star sign and appeared on coins and legionary standards. By this time they were found on many large buildings, including private houses. The earliest examples in museum collections date back to the 7th century BCE in both Greece and Etruria.

In the garden of the Villa Giulia in Rome, that houses the National Etruscan Museum, is a reconstruction of an Etruscan temple built between 1889 and 1890 on the basis of the ruins found in Alatri.  Its tiled roof is lined with antefixes.

Etymology
From Latin antefixa, pl. of antefixum, something fastened in front, from antefixus, fastened in front: ante-, ante- and fixus, fastened, past participle of figere, to fasten.

References

External links

Architectural elements
Ancient Greek architecture
Ornaments (architecture)
Ancient Roman pottery
Roof tiles
Etruscan architecture
Etruscan ceramics